Men's Slalom World Cup 1984/1985

Calendar

Final point standings

In Men's Slalom World Cup 1984/85 the best 5 results count.

World Cup
FIS Alpine Ski World Cup slalom men's discipline titles